John Lurie and the Lounge Lizards Live in Berlin 1991 is a 1992 documentary concert film directed and shot by Garret Linn. It was the director's first feature, and was filmed in Super16. It was shown at The Water Reade Theater in New York City and was part of the Berlin Film Festival in 1992.

Summary
A feature film of a concert given at the Quartier Latin Club in Berlin, Germany on March 28–31, 1991.

Cast/Players

 John Lurie – Alto & Soprano Saxophone
 Steven Bernstein – Trumpet & Cornet
 Michael Blake – Tenor & Soprano Saxophone 
 Oren Bloedow – Bass
 Bryan Carrott – Vibraphone & Marimba & Timpani
 Billy Martin – Percussion
 Michele Navazio – Guitar
 Jane Scarpantoni – Cello
 Grant Calvin Weston – Drums

Review
John Lurie and the Lounge Lizards Live in Berlin 1991 was reviewed by The New York Times and Variety.

Availability
The film was extremely difficult to find for many years. There was a limited number of screenings in Germany and the United States along with a small release in Japan. An audio CD recording of the same concert was released by VeraBra Records under the title of "Live in Berlin 1991 Vol. I & Vol. II". In early 2011 the company that made the film released a low quality version on youtube.com.

References

External links
 

Concert films
1990s English-language films